Siegenthaler is a surname that may refer to:

 Bernard Siegenthaler, Swiss sports shooter
 Fritz Siegenthaler (born 1929), Swiss cyclist
 Hans Siegenthaler (born 1923), Swiss footballer
 John Seigenthaler (1927-2014), American journalist
 John Seigenthaler (anchorman) (1955-), son of journalist
 Jonas Siegenthaler (1997-), Swiss ice hockey player
 Maja Siegenthaler (1992-), Swiss competitive sailor
 Urs Siegenthaler (1947-), Swiss footballer